Unione Sportiva Tolentino is an Italian association football club located in Tolentino, Marche. It currently plays in Serie D.

History 
The club was founded in 1919.

Serie C2 
Since the season 1996–97 Tolentino has played in Serie C2 and in Serie D.

Colors and badge 
Its colors are all-crimson.

Honours 
 Regional Coppa Italia Marche:
Winners 1: 2011–12

External links 
 Official homepage

Football clubs in Italy
Football clubs in the Marche
Tolentino
Association football clubs established in 1919
Serie C clubs
1919 establishments in Italy